Apocheima hispidaria, the small brindled beauty, is a moth of the family Geometridae. The species was first described by Michael Denis and Ignaz Schiffermüller in 1775. It is found from Spain through central Europe to Russia. In the north, the range extends to southern Sweden. In the south, it is found on all of the Balkan Peninsula (except Greece) up to the Black Sea.

The wingspan is 28–35 mm. Adult males are variable, with some individuals having a darker central band, while others are more uniformly coloured. Females are wingless. Adults are on wing from mid-March to mid-May.

The larvae feed on Quercus robur, Salix aurita, Carpinus betulus, Prunus spinosa, Prunus avium and Malus domestica. Larvae can be found from May to July.

Subspecies
Apocheima hispidaria hispidaria
Apocheima hispidaria cottei (Oberthür, 1913)
Apocheima hispidaria popovi Vojnitz, 1972
Apocheima hispidaria orientis (Wehrli, 1940)

References

External links
Fauna Europaea
Lepiforum e.V.

Moths described in 1775
Bistonini
Moths of Europe